The governor of Agusan del Norte is the local chief executive of the Philippine province of Agusan del Norte.

List

Agusan province 
The former province of Agusan was part of the Moro Province, before it was split to create the Department of Mindanao and Sulu.

Agusan del Norte 
On June 17, 1967, the province of Agusan was divided into two, creating the provinces of Agusan del Norte and Agusan del Sur. The officials of the province of Agusan continued to serve as the provincial officials of Agusan del Norte.

References 

 
Governors of provinces of the Philippines